Esch-sur-Alzette is a canton in southwestern Luxembourg. Its capital is Esch-sur-Alzette.

Administrative divisions
Esch-sur-Alzette Canton consists of the following fourteen communes:

 Bettembourg
 Differdange
 Dudelange
 Esch-sur-Alzette
 Frisange
 Kayl
 Leudelange
 Mondercange
 Pétange
 Reckange-sur-Mess
 Roeser
 Rumelange
 Sanem
 Schifflange

Population

References

 
Cantons of Luxembourg